This list identifies the police vehicles which are currently being operated or have formerly been operated by the Royal Malaysian Police.

Land vehicles

Motorcycles

Mobile patrol vehicles

Special vehicles/VIP vehicles

Transport vehicles

Armored vehicles/Paramilitary vehicles

Marine vehicles

See also : Marine Operations Force

Air vehicles

See also : Royal Malaysian Police Air Wing Unit

Retired equipments

Gallery

Sources
Royal Malaysian Police (RMP), Bukit Aman, Kuala Lumpur

See also
 List of equipment of the Malaysian Army
 List of equipment of the Royal Malaysian Navy
 List of equipment of the Royal Malaysian Air Force
 List of aircraft of the Malaysian Armed Forces
 List of equipment of the Malaysian Maritime Enforcement Agency
 List of police firearms in Malaysia

References

Malaysia law-related lists
Royal Malaysia Police
Royal Malaysian Police